Donna Anderson (born September 5, 1939) is an American character actress, active primarily in television during the 1960s and 1970s.

Early life
Anderson was born Donna Knaflich in Gunnison, Colorado, the daughter of Wenona Hanly-Knaflich and Louis John Knaflich.

Career
She made her film debut in 1959 in On the Beach, directed by Stanley Kramer. The following year, Kramer got her to star in Inherit the Wind, which led to her receiving a Golden Laurel nomination for Top New Female personality.

She appeared in a recurring role on the ABC western television series The Travels of Jaimie McPheeters, with Kurt Russell in the title role. In the story line, Anderson's character, Jenny, helps young Jaimie in his travels through the American West on the wagon train. Most of her roles were in television shows with appearances in such series as Gunsmoke, The Incredible Hulk, The A-Team, and Murder, She Wrote. Anderson was also cast in episodes of NBC's Little House on the Prairie.

She has not acted on screen since 1984.

Filmography

References

External links

1939 births
Living people
American television actresses
Actresses from Colorado
20th-century American actresses
American film actresses
People from Gunnison, Colorado
Actresses from Los Angeles
21st-century American women